Edward Howard Adelson (born 1952) is an American neuroscientist who is currently the John and Dorothy Wilson Professor of Vision Science at Massachusetts Institute of Technology and an Elected Fellow of the National Academy of Sciences and American Academy of Arts and Sciences.

Education and career
Adelson attended Yale University and received bachelor's degrees in physics and philosophy in 1974. He then attended the University of Michigan for his Ph.D. in Experimental Psychology, graduating in 1979. He was a postdoctoral fellow at NYU from 1979 to 1981, after which he joined RCA Laboratories as a staff scientist for five years. One of his most notable research outcomes is the Laplacian pyramid for visual image coding. Adelson has over 100 publications on topics in human vision, machine vision, computer graphics, neuroscience, and computational photography.

Awards
During his time at RCA Laboratories, Adelson won the 1984 Adolph Lomb Medal from the Optical Society of America. He joined the faculty at MIT in 1987, first at the Media Lab before moving to the Department of Brain and Cognitive Sciences in 1994. In 1992, he received the Rank Prize in Opto-electronics, and in 2005 he received the Longuet-Higgins Prize from the IEEE Computer Society. In 2006, Adelson was elected a member of the United States National Academy of Sciences. In 2010, he was elected as fellow of the American Academy of Arts and Sciences. In 2013, he received the Helmholtz Award from the IEEE Computer Society. In 2020, he received the Ken Nakayama Medal for Excellence in Vision Science.
In 2022, Adelson received the Kurt Koffka Medal for "advancing the fields of perception or developmental psychology to an extraordinary extent".

Adelson is also a fellow of the Society of Experimental Psychologists.

See also
Checker shadow illusion

References

External links

1952 births
Living people
American neuroscientists
University of Michigan College of Literature, Science, and the Arts alumni
Yale College alumni
Massachusetts Institute of Technology School of Science faculty
Members of the United States National Academy of Sciences
Fellows of the American Academy of Arts and Sciences
Fellows of the Society of Experimental Psychologists
MIT Media Lab people
Vision scientists